This is a list of seasons completed by the Cincinnati Bearcats football team of the National Collegiate Athletic Association (NCAA) Division I Football Bowl Subdivision (FBS). Since the team's creation in 1885, the Bearcats have participated in more than 1,200 officially sanctioned games, including 16 bowl games.

The Bearcats have been a member of numerous athletic conferences. From 1910 through 1924, the Bearcats was a member of the Ohio Athletic Conference. In 1925, the team joined the defunct Buckeye Intercollegiate Athletic Association, where it won 2 conference championships. From 1947 to 1952, the Bearcats was a member of the Mid-American Conference. From 1957 though 1969, Cincinnati competed in the Missouri Valley Conference, where it won two conference championships. As one of the founding members, the Bearcats competed in Conference USA from 1995 through 2004. In 2005, Cincinnati joined the Big East, its first time in a conference with an automatic BCS bowl bid.  After the fracturing of the Big East in 2012, the football-playing remnants of the conference, including Cincinnati, rebranded themselves as the American Athletic Conference (AAC), the league in which they currently compete.  The Bearcats have also previously played as a football "1-A" independent during extended portions of their existence.  Throughout their history, the Bearcats have captured all or a share of 14 conference titles, despite these long bouts of gridiron nomadism.

Seasons

Notes

References

External links
 

Lists of college football seasons

Bearcats football seasons
Cincinnati Bearcats football seasons